Northway Shopping Center (known as Northway Mall until 2012) is a big box retail center in Colonie, New York along Central Avenue (NY Route 5). From 1970 to 1999, it was an enclosed shopping mall with several out buildings. It is located across Central Avenue from Colonie Center, an enclosed shopping mall.

Enclosed mall (1970-1999)

The mall, which had no fountain, and only one floor for its inner complex, was alleged to have been referred to as "modern as tomorrow."

Development
 of land was purchased in fall, 1968 from the city of Albany for a price of $1.2 million.  The purchaser was developer Morris Steinberg of the city of New York. The property was originally part of Albany's waterworks property. It had been a protected part of the Albany Pine Bush from 1850. The development of Northway Mall helped to spur further development along nearby Wolf Road.

A hearing at the Colonie Planning Board was scheduled for July 8, 1969 for a proposed subdivision for the mall. A meeting between the Town of Colonie Planning Board, the Village of Colonie Planning Commission, and representatives of the developers took place on August 19, 1969, where partial approval was given to begin preliminary work.  Work to level the land had actually commenced prior to that date. A hearing at the Colonie Town Zoning Board was scheduled for 5:15pm on September 17, 1970, regarding mall signage.  A variance had to be requested because the size of the proposed signs was larger than was allowed by zoning laws at the time.

The construction contract for the Almart's Store was held by Panzieri-Henderson, Inc., while AVR Construction Co. was contracted for Korvette's.  L.A. Swyer, Inc., of Albany, held the construction contract for the smaller stores between the two anchors.  Steel for the center was purchased from James McKinney & Sons, Inc., of Albany.

Initial anchors
Initial plans called for the south end of the mall to have a single-level E. J. Korvette Store at 140,000 square feet.  Korvette's opened on October 15, 1970.

It opened on October 8, 1970, being the first store in the mall to open.

About thirty smaller stores were planned between the two anchors.

Other initial tenants
A  Woolworth's store was announced prior to the opening of the mall.

On October 21, 1969, the National Commercial Bank and Trust Co. of Albany was approved by the United States Comptroller of the Currency to open a branch in the mall.

The Time-Out Tunnel: Tico Bonomo, former owner of Bonomo's Turkish Taffy, established the first Time-Out Family Amusement Center in the Northway Mall in 1970 and was one of its very first tenants. The Time-Out Tunnel, as it came to be known, turned into a chain of mall arcades throughout the Northeast in the 1970s and 1980s. The Time-Out Tunnel at Nothway Mall remained in operation through the end of December 1998 when the mall was finally closed. The Time-Out Tunnel therefore has the distinction of being a tenant from the mall's inception right through the very end of its existence as an enclosed mall.

St. Francis Chapel
A long-time tenant at Northway Mall was St. Francis Chapel, a Catholic Franciscan chapel, sponsored by the Holy Name Province of the Order Friars Minor.  Apart from a sanctuary, it had a front counter staffed by a priest, and a consultation where anyone, Catholic or otherwise, could receive guidance from members of the clergy.  It was located on the western side of the mall between Almart's and the Motherhood Maternity Shop.  Like any other store in the mall, they paid rent based on square footage, at retail rates.

It was hoped the chapel would be open by October, 1970, then by November, but it did not open until December 1970, due to construction delays. The chapel informally opened on December 28, 1970. Initial staff included Rev. Fabian Joyce, rector, Rev. Malcolm MacDonald, Brother Lawrence McLeod, and Rev. Conall Hart. Initial hours were 10am to 9pm, Monday through Saturday. It was the only area Catholic church closed on Sundays. The intent of the chapel was to provide spiritual services to both shoppers and store employees.

Thirty-five people attended the first (concelebrated) Mass at the chapel without any announcement or advertising.  In the initial days since it opened, an average of 500 people visited the chapel.  While furnishings were waiting to be received, nearby stores loaned items to be used in the chapel.  Masses took place at 10am, 12:10pm, and 5:10pm on weekdays.  Mass times at ten minutes after the hour were intended to accommodate store employee lunch or dinner breaks.

Fr. Fabian Joyce, ordained 1943, came from Worcester, Massachusetts and had been serving at Our Lady's Chapel in New Bedford, Massachusetts for the six years prior to becoming rector of St. Francis Chapel.  After a few years at the mall, Fr. Joyce suggested that the location has brought people back to the faith.

On the afternoon of March 10, 1971, the Most Rev. Bishop Broderick, D.D., of the Albany, New York Catholic Diocese, blessed the altar of St. Francis Chapel in a concelebrated dedication Massachusetts  The bishop commented that while traditional forms of worship like the Rosary, Stations of the Cross, and Exposition of the Blessed Sacrament were falling out of favor, it was good to see evidence of them at St. Francis Chapel.  It was estimated that approximately 25,000 people had visited the chapel between its unofficial opening in late December 1970, and its official dedication.  Fr. Fabian Joyce, rector, joked about one of the initial visitors mistaking the chapel for a bank and the priests as tellers.

By the late 1970s, Masses were being held four times per day.  Eight Masses were held on Saturdays.  Weekday masses attracted thirty to forty people while Saturday vigil Masses for Sunday obligation attracted around 200.

The chapel in the mall attracted people from many faiths who came in to worship as they saw fit.

Loss of initial anchors
Only about ten years after the mall opened, initial major anchors Almart's and Korvette's, closed.  In 1983, the space formerly occupied by Korvette's was developed into an area for small discount stores.  However, this did not prove successful.

Miscellaneous notes
The mall was once known as the "Off Price Center" but the owners moved away from that term by late 1989, using the word "value" instead.

It was alleged that Mildred Elley Business College was considering space in the mall in 1998.

Decline
In 1995, the mall owners spent $2 million to upgrade the look of the mall with new foliage and designs.  This did not attract new tenants.

By October 12, 1997, the only restaurant left in the mall was Ario's Pizza, after Rick's Cafe closed a few days prior.

On October 10, 1997, anchor Montgomery Ward announced it would be closing its anchor store at the Northway Mall along with stores at other locations.  (The store closing in Northway Mall was completed in January, 1998.) Also in 1997, anchors Lechmere (chain owned by Montgomery Ward by March 31, 1994 --- this store located in an outbuilding), and Woolworth's closed their stores in the mall.  By October 1997, there was space for 40 stores, but only half had tenants.  Despite this, a spokesman for the mall's owner indicated in October 1997 that demolition was not being considered.

By December 1998, less than twelve stores remained open. The mall would close at the end of 1998.  In December 1998, some store owners complained of only being given thirty days' notice of the closure.  Due to having a lease, Marshall's remained in the mall into 1999.

Demolition
Demolition of most of the mall began in May, 1999.  In comments published a year after demolition, a spokesman for the mall's owner pointed out that the mall was not large enough to compete with newer, modern malls.  The space housing David's Bridal would remain as a free-standing building.

Big Box Center (1999 - present)

Development
The portion of the original enclosed mall housing David's Bridal would remain as a detached building while free standing buildings housing multiple stores would be built behind.  The developers needed a variance from the Town of Colonie Planning Board.  This was given in December 1998.

Initial anchor/tenants
 Target (anchor)
 David's Bridal
 Jo-Ann etc. (moved to new building, switched to larger Jo-Ann etc. format)
 Linens n' Things (closed)
 Marshall's
 Eddie Bauer Outlet
 Dress Barn

Closing of Cine 10
The Hoyt's Cine 10 movie theaters, in operation for over 20 years, did not renew their lease which ended in August, 2000. The building was 30 years old (as of 2000), had ten screens and 2,000 seats. It was suggested that competition from other Hoyt's theatres reduced the profits of this specific cinema.

Miscellaneous notes
L.L. Bean considered the space formerly occupied by the Lechmere store but declined due to the need (at the time) to demolish that building and build a new one. In 2012, the Northway Mall was renamed Northway Shopping Center as the old Northway Mall sign was removed and replaced with a new sign featuring the new name and store lineup.

Sources

External links
 DeadMalls.com - Northway Mall

Shopping malls in Albany County, New York
Colonie, New York